Hunt Diederich (May 3, 1884 – May 14, 1953) was an American painter. His work was part of the art competitions at the 1928 Summer Olympics and the 1932 Summer Olympics.

References

1884 births
1953 deaths
20th-century American painters
American male painters
Olympic competitors in art competitions
20th-century American male artists